Patricia May better known as Patsy May, married Patricia Fayne (born 22 August 1947 in Camberwell, Victoria Victoria) is an Australian former cricket player. May played seven tests and nine one day internationals for the Australia national women's cricket team.

Patsy was educated at Lindfield East Public School (1952–1959) and Wenona, North Sydney (1960–1964). She studied for a Bachelor of Education at The University of Sydney (1965–1968) where she was awarded a double Blue in Cricket and Softball. 

Patsy spent her working life with the NSW Department of Education teaching in the western suburbs of Sydney and retired as Deputy Principal of Dapto High School in 2000.
Patsy May married Michael James Fayne in 1991, settling in Gerroa on the South Coast of NSW.

Her cricket story began in the back yard with brother David and continued with an annual game, Day Girls v Boarders, at Wenona. Her competitive cricket career began at Sydney University alongside Ann Mitchell (1965–1968) then with Graduates (1969–1985) She played for NSW Juniors (1965–1968), NSW Seniors (1966–1975) and the Australian Women's Cricket team (1968–1976). The highlight of her cricketing career was being the first Australian woman to take a wicket on Lords.

References

External links

 Patsy May at CricketArchive
 Patricia May at southernstars.org.au

Living people
1947 births
Australia women Test cricketers
Australia women One Day International cricketers